The Women's 1500 metres event at the 2011 European Athletics U23 Championships was held in Ostrava, Czech Republic, at Městský stadion on 16 and 17 July.

Medalists

Results

Final
17 July 2011 / 16:00

†: Elena Arzhakova ranked initially 1st (4:20.55), but was disqualified later for infringement of IAAF doping rules.

Intermediate times:
400m: 1:15.07 Daniela Cunha 
800m: 2:31.51 Daniela Cunha 
1200m: 3:38.42 Elena Arzhakova

Heats
Qualified: First 4 in each heat (Q) and 4 best performers (q) advance to the Final

Summary

†: Elena Arzhakova initially reached the final (4:08.77), but was disqualified later for infringement of IAAF doping rules.

Details

Heat 1
16 July 2011 / 10:05

†: Elena Arzhakova initially reached the final (4:08.77), but was disqualified later for infringement of IAAF doping rules.

Intermediate times:
400m: 1:05.44 Diana Sujew 
800m: 2:13.94 Elena Arzhakova 
1200m: 3:21.99 Elena Arzhakova

Heat 2
16 July 2011 / 10:15

Intermediate times:
400m: 1:10.20 Jennifer Wenth 
800m: 2:20.67 Jennifer Wenth 
1200m: 3:27.34 Elina Sujew

Participation
According to an unofficial count, 20 athletes from 15 countries participated in the event.

References

1500 metres
1500 metres at the European Athletics U23 Championships
2011 in women's athletics